The 2002–03 season was Chelsea's 89th competitive season, 11th consecutive season in the Premier League and 97th year as a club. Managed by Claudio Ranieri, the club did not manage to win any silverware.

In the Premier League, Chelsea finished fourth behind Manchester United, Arsenal and Newcastle United. With the fourth-place finish, Chelsea secured a place in the UEFA Champions League third qualifying round.

In the UEFA Cup, Chelsea took a first round exit, losing 5–4 on aggregate to Norwegian club Viking FK. Chelsea also managed to reach the quarter-finals of both the Football League Cup and the FA Cup, but lost 1–0 to Manchester United and 3–1 to Arsenal in a replay, respectively.

Final league table

First team squad
Squad at end of season

Left club during season

Reserve squad

Team kit
The team kit was produced by Umbro. The shirt sponsor was Emirates Airline; the kit bore the "Fly Emirates" logo. Chelsea's home kit (all blue with a white trimmed collar) was carried over from the previous campaign. Their new away kit was all black with blue accents. The club's third kit for this season was the club's away kit from the previous season, all white with blue socks and accents.

Statistics

|}

Results

FA Premier League

UEFA Cup

First Round

FA Cup

League Cup

Transfers

In

Out

References

External links
 Chelsea FC Official Website
 Chelsea FC on Soccerbase
 Chelsea FC on BBC

Chelsea F.C. seasons
Chelsea